On 15 November 1988, a man named Barend Strydom carried out a shooting spree at Strijdom Square in central Pretoria, South Africa, killing 8 people and injuring 16 others. Seven of the victims were black, while one was Indian. Strydom was later convicted and sentenced to death for the attack. It was one of many shootings during the apartheid struggle. The square itself has since been renamed Lillian Ngoyi Square.

The attack 
The Delmas Treason Trial was ongoing in Pretoria when Strydom, age 23, opened fire on 15 November 1988, killing eight and injuring 16.

Perpetrator 

Barend Hendrik Strydom (born 15 July 1965) was born in Wenen, Natal, South Africa. He joined the South African Police, but was dismissed after photographing himself with a decapitated motorist at the scene of an automobile accident.

A week prior, on 8 November 1988, he had killed a woman and injured another person. After the attack, Strydom claimed he was the leader of the White Wolves, but this was later dismissed as a fictitious organization invented by Strydom. He also said that he had meditated and prayed a number of days before the attack and said that God had not given him any sign to not to carry out the attack. He was sentenced to death; However, in 1990, the government declared a moratorium on capital punishment. In 1992, he was released from prison by President F. W. de Klerk as one of 150 political prisoners. He was then granted amnesty in 1994 by the Truth and Reconciliation Commission on the grounds that his attack was politically motivated.

Memorial 
On the 30th anniversary of the attack, on 15 November 2018, the names of the victims were read aloud in a ceremony. A commemorative plaque was dedicated in the square, created by Bradley Steyn, who had witnessed the massacre as a teenager. The ceremony was attended by Carl Niehaus, a spokesperson for the UMkhonto we Sizwe Military Veterans' Association, and two family members of the victims.

See also 

 Carel Johannes Delport

References
http://www.702.co.za/articles/327291/son-of-satat-carrim-killed-by-wit-wolf-recounts-the-day-his-father-was-shot

External links 
 Wit Wolf: Amnesty probe 
 Sentence 'a warning to racists' 
 The Strijdom Square Massacre
 Statement On Misrepresentation Over Release Of Barend Strydom

Mass shootings in South Africa
History of Pretoria
Racially motivated violence against black people
Massacres in 1988
1988 murders in South Africa
1988 mass shootings in Africa
1980s massacres in South Africa
Events in Pretoria